Keith "Kayamba" Gumbs (born 11 September 1972 in St. Kitts, Saint Kitts and Nevis) is a retired St. Kitts and Nevis international football player.

Playing career 
Gumbs began playing football while he was attending the Newtown Primary School (now the Tucker/Clarke Primary School), continued at Basseterre Junior High (now the Washington Archilbald High School) and then Basseterre Senior High where he finished his schooling. Gumbs played various other sports as well, including cricket and basketball.

In his debut first division season in 1989, he helped Newtown to win the double (league and cup) earning him a called up to the National Senior team by the then head coach Alphonso Bridgewater.

Gumbs now plays amateur football for Southern & Ettalong United in Australia, where he now lives.

Coaching career 
Gumbs began his coaching career as a Physical Coach on Sriwijaya F.C. in 2011-2012 Season as a player and Physical Coach. In 2016 Indonesia Soccer Championship A he was appointed again to be Assistant coach of Sriwijaya F.C.

Honours

Club honors 
Happy Valley
 Hong Kong First Division League (1): 2002–03

Kitchee
 Hong Kong League Cup (2): 2005–06, 2006–07
 Hong Kong Senior Challenge Shield (1): 2005–06

Sriwijaya
 Liga Indonesia/Indonesia Super League(2): 2007–08, 2011–12
 Piala Indonesia (3): 2007–08, 2008–09, 2010
 Indonesian Community Shield (1): 2010
 Indonesian Inter Island Cup (1): 2010

Arema Cronus
 Menpora Cup (1): 2013

Individual honors 
 Hong Kong League Top Scorer 2002 - 2003
 Hong Kong Senior Challenge Shield Top Scorer (2): 2004–05, 2005–06
 Hong Kong League Cup Top Scorer (1): 2005–06
 Piala Indonesia Best player (1): 2010
 Indonesia Super League Best player (1): 2011–12
 Recipient of the National Medal of Honour Award St. Kitts and Nevis 2010
 Recognised and listed among the World's Top 100 players and Goal scorers according to the International Federation of Football History 2010
 Runner-up Indonesia Super League 2013 (Arema)
 Champion Indonesia International Tournament (Menpora Cup) 2013 - Arema
 Best Player Award Menpora Cup 2013
 Golden Boot Winner Menpora Cup 2013
 Central Coast Football, Australia Pele Sports Division 1 Men's Player of the Year 2014
 Central Coast Football, Australia Battlewin Premier League 1 Men's Golden Boot 2015

International goals 

Saint Kitts and Nevis' score is listed first.

Notes and references

External links 
 Keith Kayamba Gumbs – Official Website
 Keith Gumbs at HKFA
 Profile at Kitchee.com 

1972 births
Living people
People from Basseterre
Saint Kitts and Nevis footballers
Saint Kitts and Nevis expatriate footballers
Saint Kitts and Nevis international footballers
Association football forwards
Panionios F.C. players
Happy Valley AA players
Kitchee SC players
Hong Kong First Division League players
Expatriate footballers in Austria
Expatriate footballers in Brazil
Expatriate footballers in Greece
Expatriate footballers in Hong Kong
Expatriate footballers in Malaysia
Expatriate footballers in Trinidad and Tobago
Sabah F.C. (Malaysia) players
Expatriate footballers in Indonesia
Liga 1 (Indonesia) players
Sriwijaya F.C. players
Indonesian Super League-winning players
Super League Greece players
Sociedade Esportiva Palmeiras players
San Juan Jabloteh F.C. players
Arema F.C. players
SK Sturm Graz players
Newtown United FC players
Saint Kitts and Nevis expatriate sportspeople in England
Saint Kitts and Nevis expatriate sportspeople in Trinidad and Tobago
Saint Kitts and Nevis expatriate sportspeople in Malaysia
Saint Kitts and Nevis expatriate sportspeople in Indonesia
Saint Kitts and Nevis expatriate sportspeople in Hong Kong
Saint Kitts and Nevis expatriate sportspeople in Greece
Saint Kitts and Nevis expatriate sportspeople in Brazil
Saint Kitts and Nevis expatriate sportspeople in Austria
Hong Kong League XI representative players